The Liberal Party was a political party in Hungary between 1875 and 1906.

History
The party was established in February 1875 by a merger of the Deák Party and the Left Centre. It won a huge majority in the 1875 elections, with former Left Centre member Kálmán Tisza becoming Prime Minister. Kálmán Tisza remained Prime Minister until 1890, and using violence,.    The Liberal Party was a main supporter of the Austro-Hungarian Compromise of 1867 and the partnership with Austria. However the Austro-Hungarian Compromise remained bitterly unpopular among the ethnic Hungarian voters, and the continuous successes of these pro-compromise Liberal Party in the Hungarian parliamentary elections caused long lasting frustration for Hungarians. The ethnic minorities had the key role in the political maintenance of the compromise in Hungary, because they were able to vote the pro-compromise Liberal Party into the position of the majority/ruling parties of the Hungarian parliament. The pro-compromise liberal parties were the most popular among ethnic minority voters, however i.e. the Slovak, Serb and Romanian minority parties remained unpopular among their own ethnic minority voters. The Liberal Party was often called as the  "Imperialist Party", in Hungary it meant to being supporter of the Austro-Hungarian Compromise, and had a negative connotation as a supporter of the political and economic interests of Austrian Empire, and the Habsburg Emperor, hence the ethnic Hungarian voters mocked the party as "the Imperialists". In the 1905 elections, the coalitions of Hungarian nationalist parties like the Independence and '48 Party won the most seats. The nationalist coalition was supported by the overwhelming majority of ethnic Hungarian voters. In 1906 King Franz Joseph announced a new election, which was won by the nationalist coalition again. Due to these defeat at the parliamentary election, the Liberal Party has disbanded itself, and it was reorganized under a new name: National Party of Work in 1910.

The party passed legislation for Jewish emancipation and appointed Jews to parliament (both the upper and lower houses) in 1867. In return, many Jews supported the party. Many districts of Budapest, where Jews made up half of the voters, reliably voted for the Liberal candidate.

References

Defunct political parties in Hungary
Political parties established in 1875
Political parties disestablished in 1906
Political parties in Austria-Hungary
Classical liberal parties